Genius of Modern Music: Volume 2 is the name given to at least four different compilation albums by jazz pianist Thelonious Monk. Each version comprises some of Monk's recordings as a band leader for Blue Note, recorded between 1947 and 1952 (or in the case of the CDs, just 1951 and 1952). The original LP with this title was compiled in 1952.Two different CD compilations have been given this title. Both redistribute the material from the two volumes in very different orders. The individual volumes of both CD compilations omit a July 2, 1948, session featuring "Evidence", "Misterioso", "Epistrophy", "I Mean You", "All The Things You Are" and "I Should Care", which were released on a Milt Jackson compilation instead. A 'monochrome cover' 2-CD set called The Complete Genius follows the track sequence of the original monochrome CDs, but adds all ten released Blue Note performances of these missing six titles between the contents of "Volume 1" and "Volume 2".

Track listing of Blue Note LP 5009 (10-inch 8 song LP, compiled 1952) 

All compositions by Monk, except where noted.

Side 1:
"Four in One"
"Who Knows?"
"Nice Work if You Can Get It" (George Gershwin, Ira Gershwin)
"In Walked Bud"

Side 2:
"Humph"
"Straight, No Chaser"
"Suburban Eyes" (Ike Quebec)
"Ask Me Now"

Track listing of Blue Note BLP-1511 (12-inch 12-song LP, monochrome red cover, compiled 1956) 
Side 1:
"Carolina Moon" (Benny Davis, Joe Burke)
"Hornin' in"
"Skippy"
"Let's Cool One"
"Suburban Eyes" (Ike Quebec)
"Evonce" (Ike Quebec, Idrees Sulieman)
Side 2:
"Straight, No Chaser"
"Four in One"
"Nice Work (If You Can Get It)" (George Gershwin, Ira Gershwin)
"Monk's Mood"
"Who Knows?"
"Ask Me Now"

("In Walked Bud" and "Humph" were moved to Volume 1 for this expanded edition.)

Track listing of early "red monochrome" cover CD, compiled c. 1989 

"Four in One"
"Four in One" (alternate take)
"Criss Cross"
"Criss Cross" (alternate take)
"Eronel" (Monk, Sulieman, Sadik Hakim)
"Straight, No Chaser"
"Ask Me Now" (alternate take)
"Ask Me Now"
"Willow Weep For Me" (Ann Ronell/Ronnell)
"Skippy"
"Skippy" (alternate take)
"Hornin' In" (alternate take)
"Hornin' In"
"Sixteen" (first take)
"Sixteen" (second take)
"Carolina Moon" (Davis, Burke)
"Let's Cool One"
"I'll Follow You" (Roy Turk, Fred Ahlert)

1-9 recorded July 23, 1951
10-18 recorded May 30, 1952

Re-issue
The sessions were recompiled, under the same title, on CD in 2001 as part of the RVG series. The cover art for the original 8-song LP was used. While the earlier CD grouped all takes of each title together, the recompilation put the alternate takes at the end of each session.

The July 2, 1948, session featuring "Evidence", "Misterioso", "Epistrophy", "I Mean You", "All The Things You Are" and "I Should Care" was released on Blue Note CD Milt Jackson: Wizard of the Vibes.

Re-issue track listing, compiled 2001
"Four In One"
"Criss Cross"
"Eronel" (Monk, Sulieman, Hakim)
"Straight, No Chaser"
"Ask Me Now"
"Willow Weep For Me" (Ronell/Ronnell)
"Four In One" (alternate take) (mislabeled on early printings as "Nice Work If You Can Get It")
"Criss Cross" (alternate take)
"Ask Me Now" (alternate take)
"Skippy"
"Hornin' In"
"Sixteen" (second take)
"Carolina Moon" (Davis, Burke)
"Let's Cool One"
"I'll Follow You" (Turk, Ahlert)
"Skippy" (alternate take)
"Hornin' In" (alternate take)
"Sixteen" (first take)

1-9 recorded July 23, 1951
10-18 recorded May 30, 1952

Personnel
Thelonious Monk - piano
Art Blakey - drums (tracks 1-9)
Sahib Shihab - alto saxophone (tracks 1-9)
Milt Jackson - vibraphone (tracks 1-9)
Al McKibbon - bass (tracks 1-9)
Kenny Dorham - trumpet (tracks 10-18)
Lou Donaldson - alto saxophone (tracks 10-18)
Lucky Thompson - tenor saxophone (tracks 10-18)
Nelson Boyd - bass (tracks 10-18)
Max Roach - drums (tracks 10-18)

See also

References

External links
Album's page on Blue Note website

Thelonious Monk albums
Blue Note Records albums
1952 albums